Jagdeo, or Jagday, is a village in Samundri Tehsil in Faisalabad District in the Punjab province of Pakistan.Ch. imtiaz Ahmad Kamboh Advocate supreme court of Pakistan the grand son of The great ch Ghullam Nabi lumberdar of the village is the most loving personality of Jugday. It is the most influential village of the union council, no.120 of Tehsil Sammundri. It has a population of over eight thousand.

References 

Villages in Faisalabad District